The Order of the Spur is a Cavalry tradition within the United States Army. Soldiers serving with Cavalry units (referred to as "Troopers") are inducted into the Order of the Spur after successfully completing a "Spur Ride" or for having served during combat as a member of or with a Cavalry unit. A trooper who has earned both Silver and Gold spurs is known as a "Master Spur Holder." Traditionally, each Trooper is presented spurs by his sponsor at a ceremonial dining in commonly referred to as the "Spur Dinner". The spurs are to be worn with the military uniform during Squadron or Regimental ceremonies and events or as designated by the Cavalry unit commander. In some units, gold spurs are awarded for combat inductions while silver spurs represent having completed the Spur Ride. Within the tradition, silver spurs and gold spurs hold a similar relationship for the cavalry as the Expert Infantryman Badge hold in the U.S. Army Infantry, as well as the Expert Field Medical Badge and the Combat Medical Badge hold to U.S. Army Medics. There is no Military Occupational Specialty (MOS) requirement for the Order of the Spur and the order is open to members of foreign militaries serving with U.S. Cavalry units.

History 

The tradition of having to "earn your spurs" reaches back to the beginning of the American Cavalry. When green Troopers first arrived at their new cavalry assignments they were assigned a horse with a shaved tail. This led to the nickname "Shave Tail" for newly assigned, spur-less Soldiers. These new Troopers were in need of extensive training in all areas of horsemanship. The horse with a shaved tail was given extra space in which to operate since its rider was marked as a novice. New Troopers were given the “Prince of Wales Spurs” because they may misuse or overuse the actual rawel of real spurs, injuring the horse. Only when they were able to prove their ability to perform with their horse and saber were they awarded spurs.

Spur Ride 

The Spur Ride is the only means of joining the Order of the Spur, aside from a wartime induction. The conduct of a Spur Ride varies but it is generally an event held over multiple days during which a Trooper must pass a series of physical and mental tests relevant to the Cavalry.  Some of the tests evaluate leadership, technical and tactical proficiency, physical fitness, the ability to operate as part of a team under high levels of stress and fatigue under both day and night conditions, though the specific tests vary by unit.  A written test is often also administered, with questions that cover United States Cavalry and unit history. During the Spur Ride, candidates are also often required to recite from memory the traditional cavalry poem, "Fiddler's Green", or other traditions or historical information pertaining to the Cavalry.

The criteria for participation in the Spur Ride are set by each Cavalry unit, usually at the Squadron level. Many units require demonstrated leadership ability through planning and conducting unit-level training events such as gunnery ranges, soldier task training or other non-commissioned and commissioned officer-level tasks. Some examples of minimum criteria are:

Score a minimum of 270 on the Army Physical Fitness Test (APFT).
Meet height and weight requirements of AR 600-9.
Qualify "Expert" with primary weapon (generally a M9 or M16/M4).
Be recommended by a spur holder to the senior Troop/Squadron spur holder

Upon successful completion of the Spur Ride, new spur holders are welcomed with a formal induction ceremony. The ceremony is a dining in, called the Spur Dinner, that often includes other military traditions such as honoring lost comrades, a ceremonial punch  (called a grog), and a roll call of the successful candidates. Some units also hold a "hero's breakfast" immediately following the end of the Spur Ride. During the breakfast, the unit commander presents a toast welcoming the successful candidates to the brotherhood prior to the formal induction ceremony.

Regulations 

The U.S. Department of the Army classifies the Order of the Spur as an Army tradition, so regulations for induction into the Order of the Spur and the wear of cavalry accoutrements are set by each cavalry unit commander. Lacking any Army-wide regulations, standards differ from unit to unit, but the tradition remains the same. What follows is one example of a Cavalry Squadron's policy on the wear of Stetsons and Spurs:

Department of the Army Regulations 

While the regulations governing the order of the spur are set by each cavalry commander (and so do not appear in the Army Regulation governing wear and appearance of uniforms and insignia), the practice falls under what the Army officially recognizes as a tradition. The following is from Field Manual 7-21.13 (The Soldier's Guide, dated 15 OCT 2003):

Relationship with the Cavalry Stetson 

Like the Order of the Spur, the Cavalry Stetson is an Army Tradition and regulated by a soldier's unit commander. However, unlike the Order of the Spur, the Cavalry Stetson is usually worn by a Trooper immediately upon their assignment to a Cavalry unit. While the Cavalry Stetson holds a similar status to the Order of the Spur, for members of the cavalry the awarding and wearing of the Cavalry Stetson is distinct from the awarding and wearing of spurs.  The cord around the Stetson, which in the past was used to assist with securing the Scout's horse to an object while the Soldier dismounted. Knots in the cord by the Acorns represented combat. Every half knot represented a single Combat Campaign. After two knots were given on a single Stetson, the wearer became the ‘SME’ (Subject Matter Expert) on the battlefield.

See also 
 Stetson
 Combat Cavalry Badge

References 

 http://www.cavhooah.com/spurs.htm A site about spurs in the Cavalry.
 http://www.hood.army.mil/3d_cr/about/pdfs/PolicyLetters/Stetson_Policy.pdf 3d CR's Order of the Spur regulations.
 http://www.1cda.org/MOI-CAV%20HAT%2015%20Aug%202010.pdf 1st CD's Order of the Spur regulations.

Awards and decorations of the United States Army
Military uniforms